The 1915 Primera División was the fourth season of top-flight Peruvian football. A total of 7 teams competed in the league, The champion was Sport José Gálvez.

League table

Standings

Title

External links
Peruvian Championship
Peruvian Football League News 
La Liga Peruana de Football

Peru
1915
1915 in Peruvian football